Geissois superba is a species of forest trees, constituting part of the plant family Cunoniaceae. They are endemic to Fiji.

References

superba
Endemic flora of Fiji
Trees of Fiji
Taxonomy articles created by Polbot